Murphy Oil Corporation is a company engaged in hydrocarbon exploration  headquartered in Houston, Texas.

The company is ranked 625th on the Fortune 500 and 1860th on the Forbes Global 2000.

As of December 31, 2020, the company had  of estimated proved reserves, of which 51% was petroleum, 42% was natural gas, and 7% was natural gas liquids.

The company's developed reserves are in the United States and Canada. The company also has undeveloped reserves in Australia, Brazil, Brunei, Mexico, and Vietnam.

In the United States, the company's reserves are primarily in the Eagle Ford Group area of South Texas and in the deepwater Gulf of Mexico.

The company's Canadian operations are mostly heavy crude oil projects in the Western Canadian Sedimentary Basin.

History
The company was founded in 1944 as CH Murphy & Co by Charles H. Murphy Sr. and incorporated in Louisiana in 1950.

Mason Houghland opened the first Spur gas station in Old Hickory, Tennessee in 1928. After Wilhelm von Opel invested in the company, it became a chain, with 275 locations and annual sales of $40 million. In 1957, an appeals court ruled that von Opel's son Fritz von Opel was not entitled to the share of Spur Oil Company his father had owned. Houghland bought the shares and Equitable Securities handled the public offering. Equitable arranged the merger of Spur Oil Company with Murphy shortly after Houghland's death in 1959.

Murphy entered the Malaysia market in 1999 after a purchase of three offshore blocks, solidifying its position as a player in the offshore development space. The first discovery in this area, the West Patricia prospect, was announced in 2001 and followed by a significant discovery in the Kikeh in 2002 (went into production by 2007).

In 2003, the company acquired acreage offshore Republic of Congo.

In 2004, the company sold oil fields in Western Canada for US$633 million.

In July 2011, the company sold its refinery in Superior, Wisconsin, to Calumet for $214 million.

In September 2011, the company sold its refinery in Meraux, Louisiana, to Valero Energy for $325 million.

In August 2013, the company distributed 100% of the shares in its retail marketing gasoline station chain, Murphy USA, to its shareholders via a corporate spin-off.

In 2016, the company sold its 5% stake in Syncrude Canada Ltd., a joint venture located about 25 miles north of Fort McMurray, Alberta, for C$937 million.

In 2017, the company acquired acreage offshore Brazil.

In July 2019, Murphy sold its assets in Malaysia to PTT Exploration and Production for $2.035 billion.

In May 2020, the company relocated to Houston and closed several offices.

El Dorado Promise
In January 2007, Murphy announced that it would set aside $50 million to ensure that every student graduating from the El Dorado, Arkansas, school system would be able to afford college. The scholarship, which requires that students spend a certain number of years in the El Dorado school system and maintain a 2.0 grade point average while in college, pays tuition and all mandatory fees for students, up to the highest annual rate charged by an Arkansas public university. Scholarship amounts are paid based on length of attendance in the El Dorado Public School District. For example, graduates who attend all 13 years at El Dorado Public Schools will receive 100% of the scholarship.

Legal issues

In August 2005, during Hurricane Katrina, an oil storage tank at the Murphy Oil refinery in Meraux, Louisiana, floated off its foundation and released more than one million gallons of crude oil into Meraux and Chalmette. A class-action lawsuit against Murphy Oil ended in a settlement in 2009; the company was required to pay $330 million to 6,200 claimants, including owners of about 1,800 affected residential properties in St. Bernard Parish, Louisiana.

In 2007, following a benzene leak in Louisiana, Murphy Oil was fined $395,313 in civil penalties plus $1.5 million for cleanup costs by the US EPA. The case was settled in April 2019.

References

External links

Companies listed on the New York Stock Exchange
Oil companies of the United States
Companies based in Houston
Automotive fuel retailers
Non-renewable resource companies established in 1944
Energy companies established in 1944
Gas stations in the United States
1944 establishments in Louisiana